Hans Ritzl (born 13 March 1939) is an Austrian bobsledder. He competed in the four-man event at the 1968 Winter Olympics.

References

1939 births
Living people
Austrian male bobsledders
Olympic bobsledders of Austria
Bobsledders at the 1968 Winter Olympics
Sportspeople from Innsbruck